The 1988 All-Ireland Under-21 Football Championship was the 25th staging of the All-Ireland Under-21 Football Championship since its establishment by the Gaelic Athletic Association in 1964.

Donegal entered the championship as defending champions, however, they were defeated in the Ulster Championship.

On 26 June 1988, Offaly won the championship following an 0-11 to 0-9 defeat of Cavan in the All-Ireland final. This was their second All-Ireland title overall and their first in five championship seasons.

Results

All-Ireland Under-21 Football Championship

Semi-finals

Finals

Statistics

Miscellaneous

 Cavan win the Ulster title for the first time in their history.

References

1988
All-Ireland Under-21 Football Championship